In Christian hamartiology, the sins that cry to Heaven for Vengeance (lit. "screaming sins") are four specific sins which are listed by the Bible.

While the Bible only refers to specific acts by Biblical characters as "crying to Heaven for Vengeance", in Western Christianity, these references are expanded upon and treated as establishing a category of particularly serious sins. Along with the seven deadly sins and the eternal sins, the sins that cry to Heaven for Vengeance are the most serious transgressions against the Law of Christ.

Catholic Church 

The sins are numbered as being either four or seven; they are listed as follows:

 The "blood of Abel": homicide, infanticide, fratricide, patricide, and matricide
 The "sin of the Sodomites": non-procreative sexual acts (sodomy). (cf. ).
 The "cry of the people oppressed in Egypt, the cry of the foreigner, the widow, and the orphan": oppression of the poor.
 The "injustice to the wage earner": taking advantage of and defrauding workers (cf. ).

Laurence Vaux's 1583 work, A Catechisme of Christian Doctrine, explains them as follows

Tom Hoopes of Benedictine College explicates the sins that cry to heaven for vengeance with respect to modern political thought:

The sins that cry to Heaven for Vengeance are referenced in the Douay Catholic Catechism of 1649, a compendium of Catholic doctrine. The concept is present in Catholic moral theology.

Reformed Churches 
Reformed theologian William M'Gavin opined that "the four sins that cry to heaven for vengeance; these are, wilful murder—sin of Sodom—oppression of the poor—to defraud servants of their wages" are greater in gravity than the seven deadly sins.

Other interpretations 

See also 
Blasphemy against the Holy Ghost
 Consistent life ethic
Moloch
Seven deadly sins
Salvation in Christianity
The Sheep and the Goats

References 

Catholic theology and doctrine
Christian terminology
Sin
Christian hamartiology